Xoco is a neighborhood of Mexico City in Benito Juárez borough. Xoco was originally a village dating to times before the Spanish conquest. Now it is an important commercial hot spot that lies just across the northern edge of Coyoacán, and is home to Centro Coyoacán and Patio Universidad shopping centers and the Torre Mitikah development, which will be Mexico City's biggest mixed used complex. Xoco is served by the Coyoacán station of the Mexico City metro which belongs to line 3. The national cinematheque, the Cineteca Nacional, also stands here and is home to a cemetery, the Panteón de Xoco, the IMER, the Instituto Nacional para el Desarrollo de los Pueblos Indígenas, and the Roberto Cantoral concert hall.

Education 

Private schools:
 Instituto Simón Bolívar
 Colegio Buckingham
 Colegio Handel
Public schools:
 Secundaria Técnica Num. 72

References

Benito Juárez, Mexico City
Neighborhoods in Mexico City